Governor Dickinson may refer to:

John Dickinson (1732–1808), 5th President of Pennsylvania
Luren Dickinson (1859–1943), 37th Governor of Michigan